The CBC Documentary Unit was a division of the Canadian Broadcasting Corporation from 2000 until 2015. The unit focused on documentary production, and was headed by executive producer Mark Starowicz.

Notable productions by the unit include:

Canada: A People's History
The Canadian Experience
The Greatest Canadian
Hockey: A People's History
8th Fire

In June 2014, CBC announced it would close the in-house Documentary Unit, with the last production scheduled for broadcast in the spring of 2015. The decision sparked backlash from several prominent CBC journalists and other Canadian television and radio personalities. In July 2015, executive producer Mark Starowicz announced his departure after overseeing documentary production since 1992.

References

Canadian Broadcasting Corporation
Documentary film organizations
Documentary television